For the cruise ship of the same name see M/V Clio

Clio was a  cargo ship that was built in 1939 as Bukarest by Deutsche Werft, Hamburg, Germany for Deutsche Levant Line. She was seized by Allied forces in 1945, passed to the Ministry of War Transport (MoWT) and renamed Empire Ettrick. She was passed to the Norwegian Government in 1940s and renamed Bremnes. In 1947, she was sold to a Norwegian company and renamed Clio. A sale to a Greek company in 1963 saw her renamed Panorea. She served until 1972, when she was renamed Charity and sold for scrapping, which occurred in 1974.

Description
The ship was built in 1939 by Deutsche Werft, Hamburg. She was yard number 226. She had  cargo space.

The ship was propelled by two two-stroke Single Cycle, Single Action diesel engines, which had six cylinders of  diameter by  stroke driving twin screw propellers. The engines were built by Maschinenfabrik Augsburg-Nürnberg, Augsburg. They were rated at 885 nhp, 3,860 bhp.

History
Bukarest was launched in 1939. Delivered in June, 1940, she was used by the Luftwaffe during World War II as an aircraft maintenance ship. In May 1945, she was seized at Kiel, Germany, as a war prize. She was passed to the MoWT and renamed Empire Ettrick. She was placed under the management of the Cunard Steamship Co Ltd. Her port of registry was London. The United Kingdom Official Number 180678 and Code Letters GNLR were allocated. In July 1946, she was transferred to the Norwegian Government and renamed Bremnes. The Code Letters LLTN were allocated.

In December 1946, Bremnes was sold to the Bergen Steamship Co, Bergen. She was renamed Clio in March 1947. Sevilla sank with the loss of ten crew. In 1953, there was a fire on board. In August 1963, Clio was sold to Compania Panorea SA, Piraeus, Greece and was renamed Panorea. She was operated under the management of M A Karageorgis. Her owners became Panorea Compania Naviera SA in 1969. Management was transferred to E T Kolintzas & Maltakis following this change. With the introduction of IMO Numbers in the late 1960s, Panorea was allocated IMO 5076078. In September 1972, Panorea was sold to United Shipowners Ltd, Famagusta, Cyprus and renamed Charity. She arrived on 22 September at Kaohsiung, Taiwan for scrapping. She was scrapped in 1974.

References

1939 ships
Ships built in Hamburg
World War II merchant ships of Germany
Empire ships
Ministry of War Transport ships
Merchant ships of the United Kingdom
Merchant ships of Norway
Maritime incidents in 1947
Cargo ships of Greece
Merchant ships of Cyprus